The Qieyun is a Chinese rhyme dictionary, published in 601 during the Sui dynasty. The book was a guide to proper reading of classical texts, using the fanqie method to indicate the pronunciation of Chinese characters.
The Qieyun and later redactions, notably the Guangyun, are important documentary sources used in the reconstruction of historical Chinese phonology.

History
The book was created by Lu Fayan (Lu Fa-yen) in 601. The preface of the Qieyun describes how the plan of the book originated from a discussion with eight of his friends 20 years earlier at his home in Chang'an, the capital of Sui China.

None of these scholars was originally from Chang'an; they were native speakers of differing dialects – five northern and three southern. According to Lu, Yan Zhitui (顏之推) and Xiao Gai, both men originally from the south, were the most influential in setting up the norms on which the Qieyun was based.
However, the dictionary was compiled by Lu alone, consulting several earlier dictionaries, none of which have survived.

When classical Chinese poetry flowered during the Tang dynasty, the Qieyun became the authoritative source for literary pronunciations and it repeatedly underwent revisions and enlargements. It was annotated in 677 by Zhǎngsūn Nèyán, revised and published in 706 by Wáng Renxu as the Kanmiu Buque Qieyun ("Corrected and supplemented Qieyun"), collated and republished in 751 by Sun Mian as the Tángyùn ("Tang rimes"), and eventually incorporated into the still-extant Guangyun and Jiyun rime dictionaries from the Song dynasty. Although most of these Tang dictionary redactions were believed lost, some fragments were discovered among the Dunhuang manuscripts and manuscripts discovered at Turpan.

The Qieyun reflected the enhanced phonological awareness that developed in China after the advent of Buddhism, which introduced the sophisticated Indian linguistics. The Buddhist Uyghur Kingdom of Qocho used a version of the Qieyun.

During the Tang dynasty, several copyists were engaged in producing manuscripts to meet the great demand for revisions of the work.
Particularly prized were copies of Wáng Rénxū's edition made in the early 9th century by Wú Cǎiluán, a woman famed for her calligraphy.
One of these copies was acquired by Emperor Huizong (1100–1126), himself a keen calligrapher.  It remained in the palace library until 1926, when part of the library followed the deposed emperor Puyi to Tianjin and then to Changchun, capital of the puppet state of Manchukuo.  After the Japanese surrender in 1945, it passed to a book dealer in Changchun, and in 1947 two scholars discovered it in a book market in Liulichang, Beijing.

Studies of this almost complete copy have been published by the Chinese linguists Dong Tonghe (1948 and 1952) and Li Rong (1956).

Structure

The Qieyun contains 12,158 character entries.
These were divided into five volumes, two for the many words of the "level" tone, and one volume for each of the other three tones.
The entries were divided into 193 final rhyme groups (each named by its first character, called the yùnmù 韻目, or "rhyme eye").
Each rhyme group was subdivided into homophone groups (xiǎoyùn 小韻 "small rhyme").
The first entry in each homophone group gives the pronunciation as a fanqie formula.

For example, the first entry in the Qieyun, shown at right, describes the character 東 dōng "east". The three characters on the right are a fanqie pronunciation key, marked by the character 反 fǎn "turn back".  This indicates that the word is pronounced with the initial of 德 [tək] and the final of 紅 [ɣuŋ], i.e. [tuŋ].  The word is glossed as 木方 mù fāng, i.e. the direction of wood (one of the Five Elements), while the numeral 二 "two" indicates that this is the first of two entries in a homophone group.

Later rime dictionaries had many more entries, with full definitions and a few additional rhyme groups, but kept the same structure.

The Qieyun did not directly record Middle Chinese as a spoken language, but rather how characters should be pronounced when reading the classics. Since this rime dictionary's spellings are the primary source for reconstructing Middle Chinese, linguists have disagreed over what variety of Chinese it recorded. "Much ink has been spilled concerning the nature of the language underlying the Qieyun," says Norman (1988: 24), who lists three points of view. Some scholars, like Bernhard Karlgren, "held to the view that the Qieyun represented the language of Chang'an"; some "others have supposed that it represented an amalgam of regional pronunciations," technically known as a diasystem. "At the present time most people in the field accept the views of the Chinese scholar Zhou Zumo" (周祖謨; 1914–1995) that Qieyun spellings were a north–south regional compromise between literary pronunciations from the Northern and Southern dynasties.

See also
Rime table
Peiwen Yunfu

References

Citations

Works cited

External links
A comprehensive parallel presentation of various Qieyun fragments and editions, by Suzuki Shingo 鈴木 慎吾  
Qieyun fragments found at Dunhuang by Paul Pelliot, now in the Bibliothèque nationale de France:
 (BNF link): prefaces of Lu Fayan (start missing), Zhangsun Neyan (complete) and Sun Mian (end missing)
 (BNF link): part of Lu Fayan's preface, rhyme index and start of the first rhyme group (東 dōng)
 (BNF link): fragment of volume 5 showing the 怗 tiē, 緝 qì and 藥 yào rhyme groups
Qieyun fragments brought from Dunhuang by Aurel Stein, now in the British Library (only S.2071, S.5980 and S.6156 have been scanned):
: substantial portion of the level, rising and entering tones.
: Zhangsun Neyan's preface (dated 677) and first 9 rhymes of the level tone, with somewhat fuller entries than S.2071.
: fragment from an enlarged edition used by Uighurs

7th-century Chinese books
Chinese dictionaries
Sui dynasty
Middle Chinese
Traditional Chinese phonology